Ivar Onno Odwin Asjes (born 16 September 1970 in Rotterdam) is a Curaçaoan politician who served as the 4th Prime Minister of Curaçao from 7 June 2013 to 31 August 2015. He resigned after losing a vote of no-confidence. before becoming prime minister, Asjes was a member of the Parliament of Curaçao (2010–2013) and its predecessor and the Island Council of Curaçao.

References

1970 births
Living people
Members of the Estates of Curaçao
Curaçao politicians
Prime Ministers of Curaçao
Sovereign People politicians